ShawnDre' Jones (born November 18, 1994) is an American professional basketball player for the Motor City Cruise of the NBA G League. He played college basketball for the Richmond Spiders.

Early life and high school
Jones was born in Richmond, Virginia and grew up in Highland Springs, Virginia before his family relocated to Richmond, Texas right before he entered high school. He attended George Bush High School. He committed to play college basketball at Richmond over offers from Akron and South Alabama.

College career
Jones played four seasons for the Richmond Spiders, starting his final two. As a sophomore, Jones averaged 10.3 points per game and led the team in 3-pointers made and assists off the bench and was named the Atlantic 10 Conference (A-10) Sixth Man of the Year. As a senior, Jones averaged 16.8 points (ninth in the A-10) and 3.9 assists per game and was named third team All-Atlantic 10. He finished his collegiate career as Richmond's 10th all-time scorer with 1,608 points, 5th in school history with 227 3-pointers made, and 8th with 364 assists.

Professional career

Aries Trikala
Jones signed with Trikala Aries B.C. of the Greek Basket League (GBL) on August 29, 2017. He averaged 12 points, 1.5 rebounds, and 3.4 assists over 16 GBL games in his first professional season as Aries finished last in the league and was relegated to the Greek A2 Basket League.

Canton Charge
Jones returned to the US after being selected in the second round of the 2018 NBA G League draft by the Canton Charge. He was initially waived by the Charge as part of final roster cuts on November 1, 2018 but was claimed by the team on December 12, 2018. He played in three games for the Charge, averaging 3.7 points and 1.0 assist in 10.1 minutes per game before being waived again by the team on January 9, 2019 in order to make room on the roster for newly acquired Chance Comanche.

Northern Arizona Suns
Jones was claimed off waivers by the Northern Arizona Suns on January 23, 2019. He averaged 7.1 points, 1.5 rebounds, and 4.7 assists over 15 games (2 starts) for the Suns and 6.6 points and 4.1 assists in 18 total G League games for the season.

Motor City Cruise
Jones was added to the Motor City Cruise in October 2021.

References

External links
Richmond Spiders bio
RealGM profile
EuroBasket profile

1994 births
Living people
American expatriate basketball people in Greece
American men's basketball players
Aries Trikala B.C. players
Basketball players from Houston
Canton Charge players
Motor City Cruise players
Northern Arizona Suns players
Point guards
Richmond Spiders men's basketball players